is a railway station located in the city of Ōdate, Akita Prefecture, Japan, served by the East Japan Railway Company (JR East).

Lines

Station layout
The station consists of a single island platform and a single side platform serving three tracks, connected to the station building by a footbridge. However, Platform 3 is not in use. The station is unattended.

Platforms

History
Shirasawa Station was opened on June 21, 1899 a station on the Japanese Government Railways (JGR), serving village of Yatate, Akita. The JGR became the Japan National Railways (JNR) after World War II. The station was absorbed into the JR East network upon the privatization of the JNR on April 1, 1987.

Surrounding area

See also
 List of Railway Stations in Japan

External links

 JR East Station information 

Railway stations in Japan opened in 1899
Railway stations in Akita Prefecture
Ōu Main Line
Railway stations in Japan opened in 1889
Ōdate